Finnlines Plc  is a shipping operator of ro-ro and passenger services in the Baltic Sea and the North Sea. It is a subsidiary of the Grimaldi Group. Finnlines’ sea transports are concentrated in the Baltic and the North Sea. Finnlines’ passenger-freight vessels offer services from Finland to Germany and via Åland to Sweden as well as from Sweden to Germany. The Company has subsidiaries in Germany, Belgium, Great Britain, Sweden, Denmark and Poland. In addition to sea transportation, the Company provides port services in Finland in Helsinki and Turku.

Finnlines’ roll-on/roll-off services cover the Finnish ports of Hanko, Helsinki, Kotka, Turku and Uusikaupunki, offering connections with Russian, Estonian, Polish, German, Danish, British, Dutch, Belgian and Spanish ports.

HansaLink consists of three Star-class ropax vessels (see roll-on/roll-off vessel variations) plying between Helsinki and Travemünde. For passengers it is the only direct connection by sea between Finland and Continental Europe.

NordöLink runs a ropax service between Malmö, Sweden and Travemünde, Germany. FinnLink operates between Naantali, Finland and Kapellskär, Sweden.  TransRussiaExpress (TRE) runs a regular direct liner service between Germany and Russia (Lübeck–St. Petersburg).

History

1947–1977 
Finnlines was founded in 1947 as a subsidiary of Merivienti Oy, founded earlier the same year by Enso-Gutzeit and Kansaneläkelaitos, to operate Merivienti's liner service from Finland to the United States.

Merivienti Oy was founded on 18 April 1947 by the Finnish forest industry giant Enso-Gutzeit and Kansaneläkelaitos (Finnish Social Insurance)—both completely or partially state-owned companies—to ensure transportation of forest industry products from Finland to Western Bloc countries. According to the 1947 Paries Peace Treaty with the Soviet Union, Finland had to pay US$300 million worth of war reparations to the Soviet Union, mostly in industrial goods. With only 30% of the Finnish merchant fleet having survived the war, and 2/3 of the surviving ships being used by the Allied forces or under forced charter to the Soviet Union, new tonnage was desperately needed.

[[Image:Finnhansa_IMO 6509371_F_Travemünde_1975 (1).jpg|thumb|The Finnhansa 1975 in Lübeck-Travemünde]]
In May and June 1947, Merivienti acquired three second-hand steamers for traffic into Europe. During the same year, Merivienti decided to start liner traffic from Finland to the east coast of the United States. To operate these ships, a new company Oy Finnlines Ltd, was founded in November 1947. Finnlines was a 100% subsidiary of Merivienti and owned no ships of its own—instead the Merivienti ships were operated by and marketed as Finnlines. In subsequent years, vessels owned by other companies, such as Enso-Gutzeit (for whom they managed ), Neste, Outokumpu, Yhtyneet Paperitehtaat, Amer-Tupakka and Thomesto. Finnlines' traffic into the United States begun in 1948. The used ships were soon found to be too small and during the 1950s seven new freighters were delivered to various owners to be operated by Finnlines. At this time the company started using names with the "Finn" prefix that has become characteristic of their fleet. A line to the United Kingdom was opened in 1955.

The company first begun carrying passengers in 1962, when the car ferry MS Hansa Express opened a new service linking Hanko, Finland to Travemünde, Germany via Visby in Sweden. The ship was found to be too small from the start, and Hanko a poor choice for the Finnish terminus of the line. The route was altered to Helsinki–Kalmar–Travemünde in 1963, and two large new ferries were delivered for the route in 1966. MS Finnhansa was the larger of the two sister ships, surpassing MS Finnpartner by ten centimeters; it was the largest ferry in the Baltic Sea at the time. Having two ferries year-round proved to be unprofitable and the Finnpartner was sold in 1969. In the late 60s Finnlines developed the Finnflow cargo-handling system, which resulted in the building of the company's first roll-on/roll-off freighters MS Finncarrier, MS Hans Gutzeit and MS Finnfellow.

In 1973 Finnlines purchased MS Stena Atlantica from Stena Line and renamed her MS Finnpartner, for service to Germany alongside the Finnhansa. During the winter season the second Finnpartner was sent cruising to the Mediterranean. In the same year Finnlines also placed an order at the Wärtsilä Helsinki shipyard for a new gas turbine-powered ferry for the Finland-Germany service that was to be the largest, longest, and fastest in the world. Before the new ferry was delivered several changes occurred to Finnlines: in 1975 Finnlines and their rival Finland Steamship Company (FÅA, which later became Effoa) began collaborating in freight and passenger traffic. Finncarriers was formed as a joint freight operator, while the Finland Steamship Company's Finland-Germany passenger services were merged into Finnlines' services, bringing MS Finlandia to Finnlines' fleet. This meant the second Finnpartner was chartered to Olau Line. With the Finlandia and Finnhansa, Finnlines maintained a year-round service to Germany, while MS Bore Star was chartered from Bore Line for cruising for the winter seasons of 1975–76 and 76–77 (she was marketed under the name Finnpartner).

 1977–1987 
The new, large, fast GTS Finnjet was delivered to Finnlines in May 1977, replacing both of the old ferries on the route. With her 31-knot top speed the Finnjet was able to cross the Baltic in a mere 22 hours, and her accommodations were superior to those of any ferry of the day. Unfortunately she had also been designed before the oil crisis, meaning her operational costs were much higher than originally planned. After delivery of the Finnjet, the Finlandia was rebuilt into the cruise ship MS Finnstar, becoming Finnlines' first (and to date last) genuine cruise ship. The Finnstars service was cut short by the Finnish maritime worker's strike of 1980, as result of which she ceased service and was laid up in Barcelona. In May 1981 she was sold to the Loke Shipping Co. In October of the same year, the Finnjet was rebuilt with additional diesel engines, allowing for more economic operations during the off-season.

In 1982 the first of the new jumbo-roll-on/roll-off ships was built for the Finland-United Kingdom run. Four sister ships were built over the next decade. Also in 1982, Enso-Gutzeit decided to give up its shipping activities and as a result 75% of Finnlines was sold to other shipping companies. All Enso-Gutzeit ships sailing for Finncarriers were sold to Effoa or Neste Oy and all of Enso-Gutzeit's shares of Finncarriers were sold to Effoa. Finncarriers thus became a subsidiary of Effoa. Several mergers followed during the 1980s when Effoa merged various other companies it completely or partially owned into Finncarriers. In 1986 Enso-Gutzeit finally bowed out of shipping activities completely when they sold their remaining share of GTS Finnjet (25%) to Effoa, who transferred the ship into the fleet of their other subsidiary Silja Line. In the same year a new company, Finnlink, was founded to operate freight between Finland and Sweden. The company's owners were mainly the same as the owners of Finnlines, and Finnlines itself owned 15% of Finnlink.

 1987–2002 

A full turn-around in Effoa's operations took place in 1989 when the company decided to separate their freight-carrying operations from their passenger operations. In place of dividends, shares of Finncarriers were given to stock owners, and after several mergers, diffusions, and name-changes, a new Finnlines Group was born in 1990. In the following years Finnlines acquired Bore Line, the operations of which were incorporated into Finnlines in 1992. Around the same time Finnlines started collaboration with the German shipping company Poseidon Schiffahrt on Helsinki–Travemünde traffic, which was marketed under the name Finncarriers-Poseidon. During 1994 and 1995 four new combi-roro ships (known as the Hansa class), capable of carrying 114 passengers alongside their freight capacity, were delivered for Finncarriers-Poseidon traffic.

In 1997 Finnlines made a deal with the German Stinnes AG, essentially swapping the shared Finnlines ownership of the German company BLT with the full ownership of Poseidon Schiffahrt. As a result, the company name "Poseidon" disappeared from the sides of Finland-Germany ships and Poseidon became Finnlines Deutschland. With Poseidon, the trainferry operator Railship and 40% of Team Lines also passed into Finnlines' ownership. In the same year Finnlines also became the sole owner of Finnlink. In 1999 Finnlines took delivery of two new ro-pax vessels, MS Finnclipper and MS Finneagle, both with a passenger capacity of over 400. In 2001 Finncarriers was merged into the parent company. In the same year Finnlines purchased the rest of Team Lines, and in 2002 the Swedish Nordö-Link (trafficking between Malmö and Travemünde) also became a Finnlines subsidiary.

 2002–present 

In 2004 Finnlines decided to further simplify the myriad of names under which it operated ships, merging Finnlink and Nordö-Link into the parent company. Finnlines also ordered five new large ro-pax ferries from the Italian shipyard Fincantieri. After numerous delays, the first vessel, MS Finnstar was delivered in August 2006 for the Helsinki–Travemünde service, MS Finnmaid followed later in the same year, while MS Finnlady, MS Europalink and MS Nordlink were delivered in February, March and July 2007, respectively.Finnlines interim report 1 January – 30 June 2007, retrieved 20 August 2007 Coinciding with the delivery of MS Nordlink'' the old MS Malmö Link was sold. In August 2007 it was reported that Finnlines has ordered six new ice classed ro-ro vessels from the Jinling Shipyard in China, with planned delivery dates in 2010 for the first two vessels and 2011 for the remaining four. In January 2007 the Italian Grimaldi Group became the largest owner of Finnlines and expressed interest in purchasing the entire company. However, a public tender offer made to the other owners in November 2006 resulted in Grimaldi gaining only 85,029 stocks, or 0.18% of the total. In October 2015, Grimaldi completed its acquisition of the entirety of Finnlines.

In 2018, Finnlines ordered three new ro-ro ships from the Nanjing Jinling shipyard in China.  Construction on the first ship in the class began in June 2020, with deliveries expected in 2021 and 2022.  In January 2020, two new ro-pax vessels, named the Superstar class and to be Finnlines' largest ships upon their entry into service in 2023, were ordered from the China Merchants Jinling Shipyard.

Services 

Finnlines' roro cargo ships serve Finland, Russia, Sweden, Poland, Germany, Denmark, the Netherlands, Belgium, the United Kingdom, and Spain. Finnlines also maintains freight/passenger services on the routes Helsinki–Travemünde, Naantali–Kapellskär, and Malmö–Travemünde.

Freight/passenger services

Helsinki–Travemünde 
Finnlines makes runs between Helsinki and Travemünde on three ropax ferries.
 MS Finnstar
 MS Finnmaid
 MS Finnlady

Naantali–Långnäs–Kapellskär 
Marketed as Finnlink, Finnlines offers freight and passenger service between Naantali (Mainland Finland), Långnäs (Åland), and Kapellskär (Sweden) with two ropax ferries. There are also additional roro ferries on top of the ropax services (as of August 2016).
 MS Europalink
 MS Finnswan
 MS Finnsirius (new 2023)
 MS Finncanopus (new 2023)

Malmö–Travemünde 
The Nordö Link service is currently operated by three ropax vessels.
 MS Finnpartner
 MS Finntrader
 MS Finnfellow

Freight services 

 MS Finnwave
 MS Finntide
 MS Finnsky
 MS Finnsea
 MS Finnsun
 MS Finnmill
 MS Finneco 1 (new 2022)
 MS Finneco 2 (new 2022)
 MS Finneco 3 (new 2022)
 MS Finnbreeze
 MS Finnhawk
 MS Finnkraft
 MS Finnpulp

Rosslare-Zeebrugge 

Finnlines makes runs between Rosslare and Zeebrugge with six sailings per week (3 round trips). Current ships on the route are the MS Finnpulp and MS Finnwave.

Helsinki–Gdynia 
Finnlines makes runs between Helsinki and Gdynia with three/four departures per week.

Helsinki–Aarhus 
Finnlines makes runs between Helsinki and Aarhus with two departures per week.

References

External links 

 Company website
 Finnlink company website
 Nordö Link company website
 Nordic Ferry Center
 Finnlines at Simplon Postcards
 
  Finncarriers at Fakta om Fartyg

Ferry companies of Finland
Shipping companies of Finland
Companies based in Helsinki
Transport companies established in 1947
Grimaldi Group
1947 establishments in Finland
Companies formerly listed on Nasdaq Helsinki